Perbanas Institute is a tertiary school in South Jakarta, Jakarta, Indonesia. Founded on February 19, 1969, by the National General Banks Association (Perbanas), the institute focuses on banking, finance and informatics. Established to meet the needs of banking personnel, it was organized by the Banks Association Education Foundation (Yayasan Pendidikan Perbanas, or YPP).

History 
At first YPP organized higher education in the form of Perbanas Banking Academy (AIP) which later evolved into Perbanas Academy of Banking and Accounting (AAP) in 1982. Responding to the demands and needs of the market of educated workforce the institute has grown from the academy into college, namely Perbanas School of Economics in 1988 and on December 10, 1999, it opened Postgraduate Program in Management.

Based on the Minister of Higher Education decree No. 209/D/O2007, dated October 23, 2007, Perbanas School of Economics and Perbanas School of Computer Management and Informatics (STIMIK Perbanas) merged into Institute of Finance-Banking and Informatics Asia Perbanas (IKPIA Perbanas) or popularly known as Perbanas Institute.

Degrees 
Faculty of Economics and Business
 Diploma Degree in Tax Accounting 
 Diploma Degree in Finance and Banking 
 Bachelor's Honours Degree in Accounting
 Bachelor's Honours Degree in Management 
 Bachelor's Honours Degree in Sharia Economic
Faculty of Information Technology
 Bachelor's Honours Degree in Information Technology
 Bachelor's Honours Degree in Information System
Graduate School
 Master of Management
 Master of Accounting
Other
 PPAk

Student organizations 
 Student Representatives Council (MPM)
 Student Executive Board (BEM)
 Students' Association
 Radio Kampus (Internet)
 Sports
 Basketball
 Soccer and futsal
 Baseball and softball
 Taekwondo
 Badminton
 Arts
 Perbanas Institute Choir
 Slide photography

Achievements 
 Indonesia's best School of management, 2014
IT dean Harya Damar Widiputra received the Higher Education Coordinating Board Region III Outstanding Lecturer award.
 Bachelor's honours-degree accounting and management programmes received an "A" accreditation from Indonesia's Ministry of Research, Technology and Higher Education.
 Bachelor's honours-degree accounting programme accredited by CPA Australia

Choir 
 In ... Canto Sul Garda, 8th International Choir Competition Secular and Sacred Music in Riva del Garda, Italy, October 2009: Gold V Diploma (category winner) and best conductor for sacred music (mixed choir) and Gold VI Diploma for mixed-choir folksongs 
 Bratislava Cantat I, 2015 International Choir Festival: Gold for a cappella sacred music, folksongs and adult choir

References

External links
 Official website 
 Repository 
 Digital library
 Career center
 Training center
 Dosen Blog site
 Journals
 SNAP
 Instagram
 Twitter
 Youtube
 Linkedin

ASEAN University Network
Educational institutions established in 1969
Schools in Jakarta
Universities in Jakarta
Private universities and colleges in Jakarta
South Jakarta